This is a timeline of the history of Border Television (now known as ITV Border). It provides the ITV service for most of Cumbria in England and the southern parts of Scotland.

1960s 
1960
 Border Television is awarded the contract to provide an ITV service for the English counties of Westmorland and Cumberland and the south of Scotland. There had been one other applicant, from Solway Television.
1961
 1 September – Border Television launches. The station had planned to go on air on February but construction problems with both transmitters resulted in delays until May. Border asked for a further delay as it felt that launching over the summer holiday period would affect advertising revenue.
1962
 Border manages to achieve a profit in its first year of broadcasting.
1963
 Border attracts a regional share of 60%. This success means that Border is able to pay off its start-up costs within two years of going on air.
 1964
 Border is given a three-year extension to its licence. This is later extended by a further year.
1965
 26 March – Border starts broadcasting to the Isle of Man.
1966
 No events.
 1967
 The Independent Television Authority renews Border's licence for a further seven years.
 1968
 August – A technicians strike forces ITV off the air for several weeks although management manage to launch a temporary ITV Emergency National Service with no regional variations.
 1969
 No events.

1970s 
 1970
 No events.
 1971
 1 September – Border Television marks its tenth anniversary and begins broadcasting in colour, but initially only from Caldbeck.
 1972
 1 March – Colour transmissions begin from the Selkirk transmitter.
 16 October – Following a law change which removed all restrictions on broadcasting hours, ITV is able to launch an afternoon service and Border carves out a niche for itself by providing the network with afternoon quiz programmes, most notably Mr. and Mrs. which was hosted by Border TV's Assistant Controller of Programmes, Derek Batey.
 1973
 Late 1973 – Border's local programmes are made in colour for the first time.
 1974
 The 1974 franchise round sees no changes in ITV's contractors as it is felt that the huge cost in switching to colour television would have made the companies unable to compete against rivals in a franchise battle.
 1975
 4 September – Border announces that it may have to cut back programme production following a substantial fall in net profits.
 1976
 No events.
 1977
 No events.
 1978
 No events.
 1979
 10 August – The ten week ITV strike forces Border Television off the air. The strike ends on 24 October.

1980s 
 1980
 No events.
 1981
 October – Border announces a loss of £70,000 before tax. The financial situation had been so dire that Border had considered not re-applying for the renewal of its licence.
 1982
 1 January – The Kendal transmitter is transferred from Granada to Border.
 November/December –  An industrial dispute forces Border to close for a month in a dispute over new technology, which ended only after letters asking for an improvement in industrial relations were withdrawn.
 1983
 1 February – ITV's breakfast television service TV-am launches. Consequently, Border's broadcast day now begins at 9:25 am.
 1984
 No events.
 1985
 3 January – The last day of transmission using the 405-lines system.
 1986
 No events.
 1987
 7 September – Following the transfer of ITV Schools to Channel 4, ITV provides a full morning programme schedule, with advertising, for the first time. The new service includes regular five-minute national and regional news bulletins.
 1988
 2 September – Border begins 24-hour broadcasting.
 1989
 13 February – For the first time ITV starts broadcasting a national weather forecast. Previously Border had aired its own regional weather forecast which they had broadcast at the end of their local news programmes and at closedown.
 1 September – ITV introduces its first official logo as part of an attempt to unify the network under one image whilst retaining regional identity. Border adopts the logo.
 Border begins providing a sub-regional service for Scottish Borders viewers served by the Selkirk transmitter, consisting of a short opt-out during Lookaround each weeknight.

1990s 
 1990
Melvyn Bragg becomes chairman of Border Television. He had been deputy chairman since 1985.
 1991
 16 October – Border is unopposed in retaining its licence to broadcast, allowing it to bid only £52,000 a year (or £1,000 a week).
 1992
 No events.
 1993
 14 April – Border wins the licence to broadcast a radio service to northern Cumbria and south west Scotland. The station launches as CFM. Its studios are adjacent to those of the television station.
 6 September – Border stops using the 1989 corporate look and begins to use in-vision continuity more heavily.
  December – Border branches out into radio when it was awarded the licence for a new regional radio station serving Central Scotland - Scot FM - in partnership with Grampian Television.  The station also wins the north east regional licence.

 1994
 1 September – Border's first regional radio station launches when 100–102 Century Radio begins broadcasting.
  5 September – Border updates its logo and presentation.
 16 September – In conjunction with Grampian Television, Border launches its second radio station - Scot FM launches.
 1995
 May – Grampian buys Border's stake in Scot FM.
 1 September –  Less than a year after its last refresh, Border once again updates its logo and presentation.
 1996
 No events.
 1997
 26 July – Border forms a subsidiary, Border Radio Holdings, for its radio business.
 23 September – Border's second regional radio station, Radio 106, launches.
 1998
 April – Border's struggling East Midlands station Radio 106 is relaunched as Century 106.
 8 September –  Border's third regional radio station, Century 106, opens, broadcasting across north west England.
 15 November – The public launch of digital terrestrial TV in the UK takes place.
 1999
 April – Border's sub-regional service for Scottish Borders viewers served by the Selkirk transmitter, consisting of a short opt-out during Lookaround each weeknight, is extended to cover Dumfries and Galloway and a dedicated Scottish news bulletin is introduced on weekday lunchtimes.
 8 November – A new, hearts-based on-air look is introduced.

2000s 
 2000
 March –  Capital Radio buys Capital Radio Group, when Capital Radio Group bought Border Television. 
April – New owners Capital sell Border Television to Granada Media Group.
 August – Border begins to use the opt-out service to provide split coverage of sports and occasional political programming. The station also opens an Edinburgh bureau to provide coverage of the Scottish Parliament.
 2001
 No events.
 2002
 28 October – On-air regional identities are dropped apart from when introducing regional programmes and Border is renamed ITV1 Border.
 2003
 No events.
 2004
 January – The final two remaining English ITV companies, Carlton and Granada, merge to create a single England and Wales ITV company called ITV plc.
1 November – The famous chopsticks logo is seen for the final time.
2005
 No events.
 2006
 13 December – The Berwick-upon-Tweed transmitter transfers to Tyne Tees as part of the preparations for the digital switchover of the Border region in 2008.
 2007
 14 November – The Eskdale Green, Gosforth and Whitehaven areas of Border's region becomes the first part of the UK to undergo digital switchover.
 2008
 December – Border's non-news local programming in the England part of its region ends after Ofcom gives ITV permission to drastically cut back its regional programming. From 2009 the only regional programme is the monthly political discussion show.
 2009
 25 February – ITV makes major cutbacks to its regional broadcasts in England, the Border and Tyne Tees regions are merged to form ITV Tyne Tees & Border. Lookaround is no longer broadcast from Carlisle, instead it is transferred to the studios of Tyne Tees in Gateshead. All of the separate sub-regional news programmes are merged pan-regional programmes although more localised news continues to be broadcast as a brief opt-out during the early evening programme.
24 June – The Border region becomes the first in the UK to complete digital switchover.
15 July – Coverage of the Isle of Man is transferred from Border to Granada.

2010s
2010
 Border's studios in Carlisle are closed and subsequently demolished. However, an office for Border's news and advertising operations is opened in the Kingstown area of Carlisle with news reports being sent via file server to the ITV Tyne Tees & Border studios in Gateshead.
2011
 No events.
2012
 No events.
2013
 4 January – The Tyne-Tees news service is rebranded as ITV News Tyne Tees. and pan-regional bulletins are branded as ITV News Tyne Tees & Border
 23 July – Proposals to reintroduce full regional services for the Tyne Tees and Border regions were approved by OFCOM, effectively leading to a demerger of the Tyne Tees and Border services.
 16 September – Lookaround and ITV News Tyne Tees are restored as fully separate regional programmes on weekdays with shorter daytime and weekend bulletins reintroduced. Both programmes continue to be broadcast from Tyne Tees' Gateshead studios with extra journalists recruited for newsgathering in the Border region.
2014
 6 January – Following instructions from regulator Ofcom, ITV reopens Border's sub-regional service for southern Scotland.
 12 January – The relaunching of the Southern Scotland service sees the launch of a new magazine programme called Border Life and a news magazine programme called Representing Border.

See also 
 History of ITV
 History of ITV television idents
 Timeline of ITV
 Timeline of television in Scotland

References

Television in the United Kingdom by year
ITV timelines